Atlas V is an expendable launch system and the fifth major version in the Atlas launch vehicle family. It was originally designed by Lockheed Martin, now being operated by United Launch Alliance (ULA), a joint venture between Lockheed Martin and Boeing. Atlas V is also a major NASA launch vehicle. It is America's longest-serving active rocket. In August 2021, ULA announced that Atlas V would be retired, and all 29 remaining launches had been sold. , 19 launches remain.

Each Atlas V launch vehicle consists of two main stages. The first stage is powered by a Russian RD-180 engine manufactured by Energomash and burning kerosene and liquid oxygen. The Centaur upper stage is powered by one or two American RL10 engine(s) manufactured by Aerojet Rocketdyne and burns liquid hydrogen and liquid oxygen. The Star 48 upper stage was used on the New Horizons mission as a third stage. Strap-on solid rocket boosters (SRBs) are used in most configurations. AJ-60A SRBs were used originally, but they were replaced in November 2020 by Graphite-Epoxy Motor (GEM 63) SRBs.

Vehicle description 
The Atlas V was developed by Lockheed Martin Commercial Launch Services (LMCLS) as part of the U.S. Air Force Evolved Expendable Launch Vehicle (EELV) program and made its inaugural flight on 21 August 2002. The vehicle operates from SLC-41 at Cape Canaveral Space Force Station (CCSFS) and SLC-3E at Vandenberg Space Force Base. LMCLS continued to market the Atlas V to commercial customers worldwide until January 2018, when United Launch Alliance (ULA) assumed control of commercial marketing and sales.

Atlas V first stage 

It is powered by one NPO Energomash RD-180 main engine burning  of liquid oxygen and RP-1. Thrust can be augmented with up to five Aerojet AJ-60A or Northrop Grumman GEM 63 strap-on solid rocket boosters, each providing an additional  of thrust for 94 seconds.

The main differences between the Atlas V and earlier Atlas I and II family launch vehicles are:
 The first stage tanks no longer use stainless steel monocoque pressure stabilized "balloon" construction. The tanks are isogrid aluminum and are structurally stable when unpressurized.
 Accommodation points for parallel stages, both smaller solids and identical liquids, are built into first-stage structures.
 The "1.5 staging" technique is no longer used, having been discontinued on the Atlas III with the introduction of the Russian RD-180 engine.

Centaur upper stage 

The Centaur upper stage uses a pressure-stabilized propellant-tank design and cryogenic propellants. The inertial navigation unit (INU) located on the Centaur provides guidance and navigation for both the Atlas and Centaur and controls both Atlas and Centaur tank pressures and propellant use. The Centaur engines are capable of multiple in-space starts, making possible insertion into low Earth parking orbit, followed by a coast period and then insertion into GTO. A subsequent third burn following a multi-hour coast can permit direct injection of payloads into geostationary orbit.

, the Centaur vehicle had the highest proportion of burnable propellant relative to total mass of any modern hydrogen upper stage and hence can deliver substantial payloads to a high-energy state.

Star 48 third stage 
Star 48 is a type of solid rocket motor used by many space propulsion and launch vehicle stages. It was developed primarily by Thiokol Propulsion, and is now, after several mergers, manufactured by Northrop Grumman's Space Systems division. A Star 48B stage is also one of the few man-made items sent on escape trajectories out of the Solar System, although it is derelict since its use. It has been used once on the Atlas V as a third stage for the New Horizons mission.

Payload fairing 
Atlas V payload fairings are available in two diameters, depending on satellite requirements. The  diameter fairing, originally designed for the Atlas II booster, comes in three different lengths: the original  version and extended  versions, first flown respectively on the AV-008/Astra 1KR and AV-004/Inmarsat-4 F1 missions. Fairings of up to  diameter and  length have been considered but were never implemented.

The RUAG fairing uses carbon fiber composite construction and is based on a similar flight-proven fairing for the Ariane 5. While the classic  fairing covers only the payload, the RUAG fairing is much longer and fully encloses both the Centaur upper stage and the payload.

Upgrades 
Many systems on the Atlas V have been the subject of upgrade and enhancement both prior to the first Atlas V flight and since that time. Work on a new Fault Tolerant Inertial Navigation Unit (FTINU) started in 2001 to enhance mission reliability for Atlas vehicles by replacing the existing non-redundant navigation and computing equipment with a fault-tolerant unit. The upgraded FTINU first flew in 2006, and in 2010 a follow-on order for more FTINU units was awarded. 

In 2015, ULA announced that the Aerojet Rocketdyne-produced AJ-60A solid rocket boosters (SRBs) then in use on Atlas V would be superseded by new GEM 63 boosters produced by Northrop Grumman Innovation Systems. The extended GEM 63XL boosters will also be used on the Vulcan Centaur launch vehicle that will replace the Atlas V. The first Atlas V launch with GEM 63 boosters happened on 13 November 2020.

Human-rating certification 
Proposals and design work to human-rate the Atlas V began as early as 2006, with ULA's parent company Lockheed Martin reporting an agreement with Bigelow Aerospace that was intended to lead to commercial private trips to low Earth orbit (LEO).

Human-rating design and simulation work began in earnest in 2010, with the award of US$6.7 million in the first phase of the NASA Commercial Crew Program (CCP) to develop an Emergency Detection System (EDS).

As of February 2011, ULA had received an extension to April 2011 from NASA and was finishing up work on the EDS.

NASA solicited proposals for CCP phase 2 in October 2010, and ULA proposed to complete design work on the EDS. At the time, NASA's goal was to get astronauts to orbit by 2015. Then-ULA President and CEO Michael Gass stated that a schedule acceleration to 2014 was possible if funded. Other than the addition of the Emergency Detection System, no major changes were expected to the Atlas V rocket, but ground infrastructure modifications were planned. The most likely candidate for the human-rating was the N02 configuration, with no fairing, no solid rocket boosters, and dual RL10 engines on the Centaur upper stage.

On 18 July 2011, NASA and ULA announced an agreement on the possibility of certifying the Atlas V to NASA's standards for human spaceflight. ULA agreed to provide NASA with data on the Atlas V, while NASA would provide ULA with draft human certification requirements. In 2011, the human-rated Atlas V was also still under consideration to carry spaceflight participants to the proposed Bigelow Commercial Space Station.

In 2011, Sierra Nevada Corporation (SNC) picked the Atlas V to be the booster for its still-under-development Dream Chaser crewed spaceplane. The Dream Chaser was intended to launch on an Atlas V, fly a crew to the ISS, and landing horizontally following a lifting-body reentry. However, in late 2014 NASA did not select the Dream Chaser to be one of the two vehicles selected under the Commercial Crew competition.

On 4 August 2011, Boeing announced that it would use the Atlas V as the initial launch vehicle for its CST-100 crew capsule. CST-100 will take NASA astronauts to the International Space Station (ISS) and was also intended to service the proposed Bigelow Commercial Space Station. A three-flight test program was projected to be completed by 2015, certifying the Atlas V/CST-100 combination for human spaceflight operations. The first flight was expected to include an Atlas V rocket integrated with an uncrewed CST-100 capsule, the second flight an in-flight launch abort system demonstration in the middle of that year, and the third flight a crewed mission carrying two Boeing test-pilot astronauts into LEO and returning them safely at the end of 2015. These plans did not materialize.

In 2014, NASA selected the Boeing CST-100 space capsule as part of the CCD program after extensive delays. Atlas V is the launch vehicle of the CST-100. The first launch of an uncrewed CST-100 capsule, Boeing OFT, occurred atop a human-rated Atlas V on the morning of 20 December 2019; the mission failed to meet goals due to a spacecraft failure, though the Atlas V launcher performed well.  In 2022, an Atlas V launched a Starliner capsule for the second time, ending with mission success.

Project Kuiper 
Amazon has selected the Atlas V to launch satellites for Project Kuiper. Project Kuiper will offer a high-speed satellite internet constellation service. The contract signed with Amazon is for nine launches. Project Kuiper aims to put thousands of satellites into orbit. ULA is Amazon's first launch provider.

Versions 

Each Atlas V booster configuration has a three-digit designation. The first digit shows the diameter (in meters) of the payload fairing and has a value of "4" or "5" for fairing launches and "N" for crew capsule launches (as no payload fairing is used when a crew capsule is launched). The second digit indicates the number of solid rocket boosters (SRBs) attached to the base of the launch vehicle and can range from "0" through "3" with the  fairing, and "0" through "5" with the  fairing. As seen in the first image, all SRB layouts are asymmetrical. The third digit represents the number of engines on the Centaur stage, either "1" or "2".

For example, an Atlas V 551 has a 5-meter fairing, 5 SRBs, and 1 Centaur engine, whereas an Atlas V 431 has a 4-meter fairing, 3 SRBs, and 1 Centaur engine. The Atlas V N22 with no fairing, two SRBs, and 2 Centaur engines was first launched in 2019. The flight carried the Starliner vehicle for its first orbital test flight.

, all versions of the Atlas V, its design and production rights, and intellectual property rights are owned by ULA and Lockheed Martin.

Capabilities 
List date: 8 August 2019  Mass to LEO numbers are at an inclination of 28.5°.

Upper stages

 SEC – Single Engine Centaur
 DEC – Dual Engine Centaur

Launch system status

Launch cost 
Before 2016, pricing information for Atlas V launches was limited. In 2010, NASA contracted with ULA to launch the MAVEN mission on an Atlas V 401 for approximately US$187 million. The 2013 cost of this configuration for the U.S. Air Force under their block buy of 36 launch vehicles was US$164 million. In 2015, the TDRS-M launch on an Atlas 401 cost NASA US$132.4 million.

Starting in 2016, ULA provided pricing for the Atlas V through its RocketBuilder website, advertising a base price for each launch vehicle configuration, which ranges from US$109 million for the 401 up to US$153 million for the 551. Each additional SRB adds an average of US$6.8 million to the cost of the launch vehicle. Customers can also choose to purchase larger payload fairings or additional launch service options. NASA and Air Force launch costs are often higher than equivalent commercial missions due to additional government accounting, analysis, processing, and mission assurance requirements, which can add US$30–80 million to the cost of a launch.

In 2013, launch costs for commercial satellites to GTO averaged about US$100 million, significantly lower than historic Atlas V pricing. However, in recent years the price of an Atlas V [401] has dropped from approximately US$180 million to US$109 million, in large part due to competitive pressure that emerged in the launch services marketplace during the early 2010s. ULA CEO Tory Bruno stated in 2016 that ULA needs at least two commercial missions each year in order to stay profitable going forward. ULA is not attempting to win these missions on purely lowest purchase price, stating that it "would rather be the best value provider". In 2016, ULA suggested that customers would have much lower insurance and delay costs because of the high Atlas V reliability and schedule certainty, making overall customer costs close to that of using competitors like the SpaceX Falcon 9.

Historically proposed versions 
In 2006, ULA offered an Atlas V Heavy option that would use three Common Core Booster (CCB) stages strapped together to lift a  payload to low Earth orbit. ULA stated at the time that 95% of the hardware required for the Atlas V Heavy has already been flown on the Atlas V single-core vehicles. The lifting capability of the proposed launch vehicle was to be roughly equivalent to the Delta IV Heavy, which uses RS-68 engines developed and produced domestically by Aerojet Rocketdyne.

A 2006 report, prepared by the RAND Corporation for the Office of the Secretary of Defense, stated that Lockheed Martin had decided not to develop an Atlas V heavy-lift vehicle (HLV). The report recommended for the U.S. Air Force and the National Reconnaissance Office (NRO) to "determine the necessity of an EELV heavy-lift variant, including development of an Atlas V Heavy", and to "resolve the RD-180 issue, including coproduction, stockpile, or United States development of an RD-180 replacement".

In 2010, ULA stated that the Atlas V Heavy variant could be available to customers 30 months from the date of order.

Atlas V PH2
In late 2006, the Atlas V program gained access to the tooling and processes for 5-meter-diameter stages used on Delta IV when Boeing and Lockheed Martin space operations were merged into the United Launch Alliance. This led to a proposal to combine the 5-meter-diameter Delta IV tankage production processes with dual RD-180 engines, resulting in the Atlas Phase 2.

An Atlas V PH2-Heavy consisting of three 5-meter stages in parallel with six RD-180s was considered in the Augustine Report as a possible heavy lifter for use in future space missions, as well as the Shuttle-derived Ares V and Ares V Lite. If built, the Atlas PH2-Heavy was projected to be able to launch a payload mass of approximately  into an orbit of 28.5° inclination.

Booster for GX rocket
The Atlas V Common Core Booster was to have been used as the first stage of the joint US-Japanese GX rocket, which was scheduled to make its first flight in 2012. GX launches would have been from the Atlas V launch complex at Vandenberg Air Force Base, SLC-3E. However, the Japanese government decided to cancel the GX project in December 2009.

Out-licensing rejected by ULA
In May 2015, a consortium of companies, including Aerojet and Dynetics, sought to license the production or manufacturing rights to the Atlas V using the AR1 engine in place of the RD-180. The proposal was rejected by ULA.

Atlas V launches 

ULA has stopped selling the Atlas V. It will fly 19 more launches.

For planned launches, see List of Atlas launches (2020–2029).

Notable missions 
The first payload, the Hot Bird 6 communications satellite, was launched to geostationary transfer orbit (GTO) on 21 August 2002 by an Atlas V 401.

On 12 August 2005, the Mars Reconnaissance Orbiter was launched aboard an Atlas V 401 launch vehicle from Space Launch Complex 41 at Cape Canaveral Air Force Station (CCAFS). The Centaur upper stage of the launch vehicle completed its burns over a 56-minute period and placed MRO into an interplanetary transfer orbit towards Mars.

On 19 January 2006, New Horizons was launched by a Lockheed Martin Atlas V 551 rocket. A third stage was added to increase the heliocentric (escape) speed. This was the first launch of the Atlas V 551 configuration with five solid rocket boosters, and the first Atlas V with a third stage.

On 6 December 2015, Atlas V lifted its heaviest payload to date into orbit – a  Cygnus resupply craft.

On 8 September 2016, the OSIRIS-REx Asteroid Sample Return Mission was launched on an Atlas V 411 launch vehicle. It arrived at the asteroid Bennu in December 2018 and departed back to Earth in May 2021 to arrive September 2022 at with a sample ranging from 60 grams to 2 kilograms in 2023.

The first four Boeing X-37B spaceplane missions were successfully launched with the Atlas V. The X-37B, also known as the Orbital Test Vehicle (OTV), is a reusable robotic spacecraft operated by USAF that can autonomously conduct landings from orbit to a runway. X-37B flights are launched on Atlas V's from Cape Canaveral Space Force Station in Florida. The first Vandenberg Air Force Base landing at the Space Shuttle  runway occurred in December 2010. Landings occur at both Vandenberg and Cape Canaveral depending on mission requirements.

On 20 December 2019, the first Starliner crew capsule was launched in Boe-OFT un-crewed test flight. The Atlas V launch vehicle performed flawlessly but an anomaly with the spacecraft left it in a wrong orbit. The orbit was too low to reach the flight's destination of ISS, and the mission was subsequently cut short.

Mission success record 
In its 94 launches (as of July 2022), starting with its first launch in August 2002, Atlas V has achieved a 100% mission success rate and a 98.93% vehicle success rate. This is in contrast to the industry success rate of 90%–95%.

The first anomalous event in the use of the Atlas V launch system occurred on 15 June 2007, when the engine in the Centaur upper stage of an Atlas V shut down early, leaving its payload – a pair of NROL-30 ocean surveillance satellites – in a lower than intended orbit. The cause of the anomaly was traced to a leaky valve, which allowed fuel to leak during the coast between the first and second burns. The resulting lack of fuel caused the second burn to terminate 4 seconds early. Replacing the valve led to a delay in the next Atlas V launch. However, the customer (the National Reconnaissance Office) categorized the mission as a success.

A flight on 23 March 2016, suffered an underperformance anomaly on the first-stage burn and shut down 5 seconds early. The Centaur proceeded to boost the Orbital Cygnus payload, the heaviest on an Atlas to date, into the intended orbit by using its fuel reserves to make up for the shortfall from the first stage. This longer burn cut short a later Centaur disposal burn. An investigation of the incident revealed that this anomaly was due to a fault in the main engine mixture-ratio supply valve, which restricted the flow of fuel to the engine. The investigation and subsequent examination of the valves on upcoming missions led to a delay of the next several launches.

Notable payloads 

 Boeing Starliner
 Boeing X-37
 ELaNa
 Geostationary Operational Environmental Satellite
 GPS
 Inmarsat
 InSight
 Juno
 Lucy
 Lunar Reconnaissance Orbiter
 Lunar Crater Observation and Sensing Satellite
 Mars Reconnaissance Orbiter
 Curiosity
 Perseverance and Ingenuity
 MAVEN
 MUOS-1 (200th Centaur upper stage launch)
 New Horizons
 NROL launches
 OSIRIS-REx
 Solar Dynamics Observatory
 Solar Orbiter
 Space Test Program
 USA-212

Replacement with Vulcan

In 2014, geopolitical and U.S. political considerations because of the Russian war with Crimea led to an effort to replace the Russian-supplied RD-180 engine used on the first-stage booster of the Atlas V. Formal study contracts were issued in June 2014 to a number of U.S. rocket-engine suppliers. The results of those studies led to a decision by ULA to develop the new Vulcan Centaur launch vehicle to replace the existing Atlas V and Delta IV.

In September 2014, ULA announced a partnership with Blue Origin to develop the BE-4 LOX/methane engine to replace the RD-180 on a new first-stage booster. As the Atlas V core is designed around RP-1 fuel and cannot be retrofitted to use a methane-fueled engine, a new first stage is being developed. This booster will have the same first-stage tankage diameter as the Delta IV and will be powered by two  thrust BE-4 engines. The engine was already in its third year of development by Blue Origin, and ULA expected the new stage and engine to start flying no earlier than 2019.

Vulcan was initially planned to use the same Centaur upper stage as on Atlas V, and later to upgrade to ACES, however ACES is no longer being pursued, and Centaur V will be used instead.  It will also use a variable number of optional solid rocket boosters, called the GEM 63XL, derived from the new solid boosters planned for Atlas V.

As of 2017, the Aerojet AR1 rocket engine was under development as a backup plan for Vulcan.

, the first Vulcan flight is planned for early 2023.

Retirement 
In August 2021, ULA announced that they are no longer selling launches on the Atlas V and they would fulfill their 29 existing launch contracts. They made a final purchase of the RD-180 motors they needed and the last of those motors were delivered in April 2021. The last launch will occur "some time in the mid-2020s". , 20 launches remain.

Photo gallery

See also  

Comparable rockets:
 Angara
 Ariane 5
 Delta IV
 Falcon 9
 Falcon Heavy
 GSLV Mk III
 H-IIA
 H-IIB
 Long March 5
 Proton
 Vulcan Centaur
 Zenit
 Medium-lift launch vehicle
 Comparison of orbital launchers families
 Comparison of orbital launch systems

Notes

References

External links 
 ULA Atlas V data sheets
 Atlas 500 series cutaway
 Atlas 400 series cutaway
 ULA Atlas V RocketBuilder
 Lockheed Martin: Atlas Launch Vehicles
 Encyclopedia Astronautica: Atlas V
 Space Launch Report: Atlas 5 Data Sheet

Lockheed Martin space launch vehicles
Atlas (rocket family)
Vehicles introduced in 2002
United Launch Alliance space launch vehicles